Quinton is a town in Pittsburg County, Oklahoma, United States. The population was 1,051 at the 2010 census. The town was named for Elizabeth Quinton, who lived to be 116 years old. Her family still resides in and around the town of Quinton.

History 
A post office was established at Quinton, Indian Territory on March 28, 1902.  It was named for Martha Elizabeth Quinton, a prominent local Choctaw.  At the time of its founding, Quinton was located in Gaines County, Choctaw Nation.

Geography
Quinton is located at  (35.125904, -95.367470).

Demographics

As of the census of 2000, there were 1,071 people, 446 households, and 293 families residing in the town. There were 509 housing units at an average density of 453.8 per square mile (175.5/km2). The racial makeup of the town was 79.93% White, 0.19% African American, 16.15% Native American, 0.19% Asian, 0.19% from other races, and 3.36% from two or more races. Hispanic or Latino of any race were 0.93% of the population.

There were 446 households, out of which 28.3% had children under the age of 18 living with them, 46.2% were married couples living together, 16.4% had a female householder with no husband present, and 34.1% were non-families. 31.8% of all households were made up of individuals, and 18.4% had someone living alone who was 65 years of age or older. The average household size was 2.33 and the average family size was 2.94.

In the town, the population was spread out, with 24.9% under the age of 18, 7.6% from 18 to 24, 25.1% from 25 to 44, 19.2% from 45 to 64, and 23.2% who were 65 years of age or older. The median age was 40 years. For every 100 females, there were 94.7 males. For every 100 females age 18 and over, there were 85.7 males.

The median income for a household in the town was $19,531, and the median income for a family was $26,912. Males had a median income of $28,056 versus $16,797 for females. The per capita income for the town was $15,143. About 18.3% of families and 22.8% of the population were below the poverty line, including 29.3% of those under age 18 and 24.3% of those age 65 or over.

References

Towns in Pittsburg County, Oklahoma
Towns in Oklahoma